Katherine Cox may refer to:

 Katherine Garrett-Cox, British business executive
 Katherine Laird Cox, British socialist feminist

See also
 Catherine Cox (disambiguation)
 Kathy Cox (disambiguation)